KeKu is a VoIP company based in New York City, in the United States. KeKu, formed in April 2010, currently offers international calling to its users by assigning local numbers to contacts in 41 different countries. KeKu uses its own patented Smart Dial technology for its services. Users can make use of KeKu's services via its iOS, Android and Google Chrome apps as well as in-browser calling from keku.com.

History
The parent company of KeKu, Stanacard, was formed on 20 March 2007. Stanacard's website had been launched two years earlier, in January 2005. The website provided a service for prepaid service cards with its patented Smartdial capability. KeKu was formed in April 2010. The company's website, keku.com, launched out of beta in May 2012. By August 2012, KeKu had reached 500,000 users for its free and paid services.

References

External links
 Official Facebook page
 Official Twitter page
 Android App
 Chrome App
 iOS App

VoIP services
VoIP companies of the United States